Venard Richard Hendrix (Macedonian: Венард Ричард Хендрикс; born November 15, 1986) is an American-born naturalized Macedonian professional basketball player who last played for Niigata Albirex BB of the B.League. He has also represented North Macedonia in international competitions. Hendrix attended the University of Alabama, where he played for the Crimson Tide. He was drafted with 49th pick in the second round of the 2008 NBA draft by the Golden State Warriors.

Early years
Richard Hendrix was raised in Athens, Alabama, born the son of two educators. He began his athletic career at the young age of five by playing basketball for the local recreation center. He played soccer, tennis, baseball and football on a competitive level where he was considered a standout on his respective teams. Hendrix attended Athens High School, the same high school that produced NFL pro bowler Philip Rivers.

At Athens High he was a four-year starter on the varsity basketball team, where he was coached by his father, Venard Hendrix. He was named 5A Player of the Year and selected as Alabama Mr. Basketball in 2005. Hendrix finished his career 92 double-doubles, nine triple doubles, and two quadruple doubles.  Hendrix scored 2,915 points in his career and currently holds Alabama high school state records (www.ahsaa.com) for career rebounds (1,820) and blocked shots (667).  Hendrix is considered one of the most decorated prep basketball players in Alabama high school history. He was selected as a two-time Parade All-American and as a participant in the 2005 McDonald's All-American Boys Game. Hendrix played AAU basketball with the Alabama Lasers Youth Inc.

Considered a five-star recruit by Rivals.com, Hendrix was listed as the No. 3 power forward and the No. 9 player in the nation in 2005.

College career
After a decorated high school career, Hendrix chose to attend the University of Alabama over the University of North Carolina. Hendrix teamed up with future NBA player Alonzo Gee and future European professional players Ronald Steele, Chuck Davis, Jermareo Davidson, and Mykal Riley. Under Head Coach Mark Gottfried, Hendrix and the Crimson Tide experienced its share of highs and lows. After an All-SEC performance in his junior season, Hendrix decided to forgo his final year of college eligibility and opt for the 2008 NBA draft.  Hendrix attained his bachelor's degree in Public Relations during his 3 years at "The Capstone."

College statistics

|-
| style="text-align:left;"| 2005–06
| style="text-align:left;"| Alabama
| 31 || 22 || 27.1 || .557 || .000 || .647 || 8.0 || 0.8 || 0.8 || 1.5 || 9.7
|-
| style="text-align:left;"| 2006–07
| style="text-align:left;"| Alabama
| 32 || 32 || 27.6 || .602 || .000 || .629 || 8.9 || 1.9 || 0.5 || 1.3 || 14.6
|-
| style="text-align:left;"| 2007–08
| style="text-align:left;"| Alabama
| 32 || 32 || 30.6 || .598 || .286 || .537 || 10.1 || 1.6 || 1.3 || 2.0 || 17.8
|-
| style="text-align:left;"| Career
| style="text-align:left;"| 
| 95 || 86 || 3.0 || .586 || .000 || .604 || 9.0 || 1.4 || 0.8 || 1.6 || 14.0

Professional career

NBA
Hendrix was drafted by the Golden State Warriors with 49th overall pick in the 2008 NBA draft. Hendrix competed in the preseason for the Warriors registering a double double of 12 points and 13 rebounds in his debut against the Oklahoma City Thunder before making the final roster. After spending several weeks on the inactive list, Hendrix was assigned to the NBA Developmental league. His rights were released by the Warriors on December 18, 2008 to create roster space for the return of Monta Ellis from injury.
Hendrix played for the Indiana Pacers in the Orlando Pro Summer League and later the Atlanta Hawks in the NBA Summer League in 2010.

D-League

On November 14, 2008, the Golden State Warriors assigned Hendrix to play for their minor league affiliate the Bakersfield Jam. His rights were released by the Golden State Warriors on December 18, 2008, ending his tenure with the Jam.

On December 28, 2008, Hendrix was acquired by the Dakota Wizards, a National Basketball Association Development League team based in Bismarck, North Dakota. Hendrix led the D-League in total rebounds for the 2008–09 season.

He was named to the 2009 NBDL All-Star Game on February 3, 2009. Hendrix was selected as a starter on the Red Team and helped lead his team to 113–103 victory. Hendrix finished the game with 11 points, 6 rebounds, 3 steals, and 2 assist in 20 minutes of playing time.

Europe
In July 2009, Hendrix signed a one-year contract with Liga ACB team CB Granada. Hendrix helped lead the club the most wins in club history as a member of the Spanish 1st Division. He was awarded the ACB Rising Star Award as the best newcomer in the Spanish league.

On June 30, 2010 Hendrix signed a two-year contract with EuroLeague contenders Tel Aviv.

In June 2012, he signed a two-year deal with Italian team Emporio Armani Milano. However, after averaging only 3.7 points and 3 rebounds over 10 games in the EuroLeague season, he was loaned to the Russian team Lokomotiv Kuban Krasnodar for the rest of the season. On July 16, 2013, it was officially confirmed that Lokomotiv Kuban extended a contract with Hendrix for three more seasons. In July 2015, he parted ways with Lokomotiv.

On July 23, 2015, Hendrix signed a one-year deal with Spanish club Unicaja. On March 9, 2016, he left Unicaja and signed a deal with his former team Maccabi Tel Aviv until the end of the 2016–17 season. On August 20, 2016, he was released by Maccabi. Two days later, he signed with Spanish club Gran Canaria for the rest of the season.

On July 14, 2017, Hendrix signed with Turkish club Galatasaray for the 2017–18 season.

Japan
On August 19, 2019, he has signed with Osaka Evessa of the B.League.  He averaged 16 points, 10 rebounds and 3 assists per game. Hendrix signed with Niigata Albirex BB on June 17, 2020.

EuroLeague career statistics

|-
| style="text-align:left;"| 2010–11
| style="text-align:left;"| Maccabi Tel Aviv
| 21 || 1 || 14.0 || .565 || .000 || .542 || 4.8 || .2 || .6 || .9 || 5.6 || 7.4
|-
| style="text-align:left;"| 2011–12
| style="text-align:left;"| Maccabi Tel Aviv
| 21 || 6 || 20.4 || .519 || .500 || .780 || 5.4 || .8 || .6 || 1.3 || 8.9 || 11.0
|-
| style="text-align:left;"| 2012–13
| style="text-align:left;"| Olimpia Milano
| 10 || 2 || 12.0 || .412 || .000 || .750 || 3.0 || .1 || .6 || .2 || 3.7 || 3.1
|-
| style="text-align:left;"| 2013–14
| style="text-align:left;"| Lokomotiv
| 23 || 15 || 23.8 || .577 || .250 || .696 || 7.3 || 1.9 || .6 || 1.1 || 10.5 || 14.7
|-
| style="text-align:left;"| 2015–16
| style="text-align:left;"| Unicaja
| 16 || 14 || 21.1 || .578 || .250 || .500 || 6.2 || 1.8 || .7 || .8 || 9.0 || 12.4
|- class="sortbottom"
| style="text-align:left;"| Career
| style="text-align:left;"|
| 91 || 38 || ? || .553 || .300 || .674 || 5.6 || 1.0 || .3 || .2 || 8.0 || ?

EuroCup statistics

|-
| style="text-align:left;"| 2012–13
| style="text-align:left;"| Kuban
| 8 || 6 || 21.3 || .600 || .000 || .625 || 5.5 || 1.1 || 1.0 || 1.4 || 10.4 || 13.0
|-
| style="text-align:left;"| 2014–15
| style="text-align:left;"| Kuban
| 17 || 6 || 20.2 || .594 || .000 || .600 || 6.5 || 1.1 || 1.3 || 1.0 || 7.8 || 12.8
|-
| style="text-align:left;"| 2016–17
| style="text-align:left;"| Canaria
| 15 || 8 || 18.0 || .610 || .000 || .677 || 3.6 || 1.1 || .9 || .7 || 7.7 || 9.9
|-class="sortbottom"
| style="text-align:left;"| Career
| style="text-align:left;"|
| 25 || 12 || 20.5 || .596 || .000 || .605 || 6.2 || 1.1 || 1.2 || 1.1 || 7.8 || 12.8

Domestic leagues

Awards and accomplishments

High school career
 Alabama Mr. Basketball (2005)
 Third-team Parade All-American (2004)
 First-team Parade All-American (2005)
 2005 McDonald's All-American Boys Game

College career
 SEC All-Freshman Team (Unanimous Choice) (2006)
 2nd Team All-SEC (2007)
 1st Team All-SEC (2008)
 Academic All-SEC (2008)

References

External links
 Euroleague.net profile
 Draftexpress.com profile
 FIBA.com profile
 

1986 births
Living people
ABA League players
Alabama Crimson Tide men's basketball players
American expatriate basketball people in Israel
American expatriate basketball people in Italy
American expatriate basketball people in Russia
American expatriate basketball people in Spain
American expatriate basketball people in Turkey
American men's basketball players
Bakersfield Jam players
Basketball players from Alabama
Baloncesto Málaga players
CB Granada players
CB Gran Canaria players
Dakota Wizards players
Galatasaray S.K. (men's basketball) players
Golden State Warriors draft picks
Liga ACB players
Maccabi Tel Aviv B.C. players
McDonald's High School All-Americans
Olimpia Milano players
Parade High School All-Americans (boys' basketball)
PBC Lokomotiv-Kuban players
People from Athens, Alabama
Power forwards (basketball)
Sportspeople from Decatur, Alabama